Blacklorg Hill is a hill in the Carsphairn and Scaur Hills range, part of the Southern Uplands of Scotland. It lies southeast of the town of New Cumnock in Ayrshire, directly east of the Afton Reservoir. It is most frequently climbed along with the neighbouring hills, starting from the Glen Afton road.

Subsidiary SMC Summits

References

Mountains and hills of the Southern Uplands
Mountains and hills of East Ayrshire
Donald mountains